The 2011 FIM Team Ice Racing World Championship was the 33rd edition and the 2011 version of FIM Team Ice Racing World Championship season. The Final was held in Berlin, Germany on 26–27 February 2011. The championship was won by the defending champion Russia (58 points), who they beat Austria (49 pts) and Czech Republic (37 pts).

World Final

Results 

 26–27 February 2011
  Wilmersdorf, Berlin
Horst-Dohm-Eisstadion (Length: 386m)
Referee:  Istvan Darago
Jury President:  Ilkka Teromaa
References

Heat details - Day One

Heat details - Day Two

See also 
 2011 Individual Ice Racing World Championship
 2011 Speedway World Cup in classic speedway
 2011 Speedway Grand Prix in classic speedway

References 

Ice speedway competitions
World Team
Ice
2011 in Berlin